Joseph Devlin (born February 23, 1954) is a former professional American football offensive tackle in the National Football League who played for the Buffalo Bills in the 1970s and 1980s.

Devlin played college football at the University of Iowa and he is a cousin of former center Mike Devlin.  Devlin is a graduate of Great Valley High School and is one of the few professional football players to attend the school, the others being Dan Klecko, Ed Seiwell, and Dan Buchholz, although Seiwell (Houston Oilers, Baltimore Colts) never played in a regular season game.

References

1954 births
Living people
People from Phoenixville, Pennsylvania
American football offensive tackles
Players of American football from Pennsylvania
Iowa Hawkeyes football players
Buffalo Bills players
Sportspeople from Chester County, Pennsylvania